Dâmbovița Lake ("Lacul Dâmbovița") is a lake situated on Dâmbovița River in Bucharest and Chiajna, west of Morii Lake and bordering that lake.

A projected underground highway entails a tunnel which will link Morii Lake,  Dâmbovița Lake, and Chiajna to Centrul Civic, Unirii Square, and the A1 motorway.

References

Dambovita